{{DISPLAYTITLE:C3H5ClO2}}
The molecular formula C3H5ClO2 (molar mass: 108.52 g/mol, exact mass: 107.9978 u) may refer to:

 2-Chloropropionic acid, or 2-chloropropanoic acid
 Ethyl chloroformate
 UMB66